Avatha olivacea is a species of moth of the family Erebidae. It is found on Seram.

References

Moths described in 1922
Avatha
Moths of Indonesia